Blagoveshchenka is a rural locality (a selo) and the administrative center of Lipovsky Selsoviet, Arkhangelsky District, Bashkortostan, Russia. The population was 490 as of 2010. There are 12 streets.

Geography 
Blagoveshchenka is located 21 km northwest of Arkhangelskoye (the district's administrative centre) by road. Novye Sarty is the nearest rural locality.

References 

Rural localities in Arkhangelsky District